Ed Hillyer, better known as ILYA, is a British comics writer/artist.

His work has appeared in publications from all the major US and UK comics companies, from Fleetway Editions' Crisis, Dark Horse's Manga Mania, Deadline magazine to work for DC Comics' Vertigo imprint. Since 2000, his works have appeared from a wide variety of international book publishers and cultural institutions, including Little Brown, Robinson, SelfMadeHero, Myriad Editions, The Royal Academy of Arts, The British Council, Lonely Planet Guides, The Independent on Sunday, The Times & Guardian newspapers, and many more.

Biography
He is perhaps best known for his character Bic  who appeared in a self-published series of comics (collected as Skidmarks from Tundra UK, 1993, and Active Images, 2003) and then as part of the larger cast of The End of The Century Club, his award-winning series of original graphic novels (Best Graphic Novel, UKCAC - United Kingdom Comic Art Convention - 1997).

ILYA collaborated with Eddie Campbell on his "Deadface"/Bacchus series (Vol II: The Gods of Business), and co-created spin-off title/series  The Eyeball Kid.

Between 2006-2008 he edited three volumes of The Mammoth Book of Best New Manga, an anthology presenting the work of an international roster of contributors whose comics show the influence or inspiration of Japanese manga and anime, including: Michiru Morikawa, winner of the International Manga and Anime Festival's grand prize in 2005, previous category winners Asia Alfasi and Joanna Zhou, as well as established UK cartoonists Andi Watson and Craig Conlan. He has been on the judges panel of the UK Japanese Embassy's annual 'Manga Jiman' (<Having pride in manga>) talent competition since 2007. 

Ten episodes of his animated online comic strip Jean Genii (originally commissioned by the BBC) are viewable online.

Ed Hillyer's first prose novel, The Clay Dreaming, was published in March 2010 by Myriad Editions.

In 2013, he completed a new graphic novel, Room For Love, about a relationship between a middle-aged romance novelist and a teenage runaway. It was published by SelfMadeHero.

He is currently resident 'Cartoon Historian', regularly appearing in alternate issues of The New Internationalist magazine - 14 episodes published as of June 2022.

Bibliography
 Skidmarks (Tundra UK, 1992)
 The End of the Century Club: Countdown  (Slab-O-Concrete, 1999)
 French language edition: "Le club de la fin du siècle" (Bethy, 2000)
 Italian language edition: "Prossima Uscita" (Alta Fedelta, 2000)
 Love S.T.I.ngs: A Beginner's Guide to Sexually Transmitted Infections (Family Planning Association)
 Time Warp: The End of the Century Club   (Slab-O-Concrete, 1999)
 Skidmarks  (Active Images, 2004)
 Manga Drawing Kit (Thunder Bay Press, 2004)
 French language edition: Manga Art (Solar, 2005)
 German language edition: Manga Zeichnen (Fleurus, 2007)
 Spanish language edition: Manga Kit De Dibujo (H Blume, 2008)
 Ballast (with writer Joe Kelly, Active Images, 2005)
 The Mammoth Book of Best New Manga Vol.1 (Carroll & Graf, 2006)
 Spanish language edition: "El Gran Libro Del MANGA", (Malsinet/Robinbook 2006)
 The Mammoth Book of Best New Manga Vol.2 (Constable & Robinson, 2007)
 The Mammoth Book of Best New Manga Vol.3 (Robinson Publishing, 2008)
 Manga Shakespeare: King Lear (SelfMadeHero, 2009)
 The Clay Dreaming (Myriad Editions, 2010)
 It's Dark in London (SelfMadeHero re-issue, 2012)
 Room for Love (SelfMadeHero, 2013)
 The Mammoth Book of Cult Comics (Running Press, 2014)
 The Mammoth Book of Skulls (Running Press, 2014)
 Colour Me Bad (Little Brown, 2015)
 "How to Draw Comics" (Lom Art, 2016)
 'KID SAVAGE' in collaboration with Joe Kelly (Image, 2017 
 'HOW TO DRAW ABSOLUTELY ANYTHING ACTIVITY BOOK' (Robinson, 2018 
 TIME TRAVELLER (co-written and illustrated in collaboration with Prof Ian Christie)
 A POETIC CITY (a biography of Chatterton, in collaboration with illustrator Willem Hampson)

Notes

References

 
 
 Ilya at Lambiek
 writerpictures.net

External links
 Mammoth Book of Best New Manga

Year of birth missing (living people)
Living people
British comics artists
Place of birth missing (living people)
British comics writers